Jewelry Box may refer to:

Jewelry Box (Shizuka Kudo album), 2002
Jewelry Box (T-ara album), 2012